Ming Nightingale (1 November 1928 – 16 June 2011) was a New Zealand cricketer. He played in twelve first-class matches for Wellington from 1950 to 1959.

See also
 List of Wellington representative cricketers

References

External links
 

1928 births
2011 deaths
New Zealand cricketers
Wellington cricketers
Cricketers from Greymouth